This list of Brussels metro and premetro stations includes all the underground stations in the Brussels metro and premetro network, arranged by line. The premetro refers to sections of the Brussels tramway network which run underground and at metro frequency.

Line 1

Line 1 replaces former Line 1B since 4 April 2009. Line 1 does not service though the stations between Erasme/Erasmus and Jacques Brel, which are now serviced by Line 5.

Line 2

Line 2 was expanded in April 2009 in order to connect the stations Delacroix and Gare de l'Ouest/Weststation. In this way the line now forms a loop between starting and ending in the Simonis/Elisabeth station complex, known as Simonis on its upper level and Elisabeth on its lower level. Most of this line (between Yser/IJzer and Brussels-South railway station) runs under the Brussels small ring.

Line 5

The Line 5 replaces the former Line 1A since 4 April 2009 between Herrmann-Debroux and Beekkant. The section of former Line 1A between Beekkant and King Baudouin is now serviced by Line 6. The section of Line 5 between Beekkant and Erasme/Erasmus was formerly serviced by Line 1B.

Line 6

Line 6 replaces the former Line 1A between Beekkant and King Baudouin since 4 April 2009. It also runs under the Brussels small ring as does Line 2.

North-South Axis

The Brussels tram routes 3 and 4 use the North-South Axis and run on surface outside the city centre. The common section offers a high service frequency during daytime hours between Vanderkindere in the municipality of Uccle and the Brussels-North railway station.  It shares 4 connections with metro lines and also links two major train stations with access to Thalys and Eurostar trains at Brussels-South railway station.

Greater Ring Axis

The Greater Ring Axis is an underground section under the greater ring of Brussels used by tram routes 7, and 25.

External links
STIB/MIVB official website

Brussels

Metro
Metro stations